Roseivirga maritima is a Gram-negative and rod-shaped bacterium from the genus of Roseivirga which has been isolated from seawater in Korea.

References

External links
Type strain of Roseivirga maritima at BacDive -  the Bacterial Diversity Metadatabase

Cytophagia
Bacteria described in 2016